Coryphopterus venezuelae is a species of goby found in the Western Atlantic Ocean from Belize to Panama, the north coast of South America, Curaçao, Venezuela. Also found in the Bahamas, the U.S. Virgin Islands, Puerto Rico, Saba, and Brazil.

References

Gobiidae
Fish of the Atlantic Ocean
Fish described in 1966
Taxa named by Fernando Cervigón